The 2021–22 season was the 95th season in the existence of OGC Nice and the club's 20th consecutive season in the top flight of French football. In addition to the domestic league, Nice participated in this season's edition of the Coupe de France.

Season overview
On 28 June 2021, reigning Ligue 1 manager of the year Christophe Galtier was appointed as the new head coach of Nice.

Players

First-team squad

Out on loan

Other players under contract

Transfers

In

Out

Pre-season and friendlies

Competitions

Overall record

Ligue 1

League table

Results summary

Results by round

Matches
The league fixtures were announced on 25 June 2021.

Coupe de France

Statistics

Appearances and goals

|-
! colspan="12" style="background:#dcdcdc; text-align:center"| Goalkeepers

|-
! colspan="12" style="background:#dcdcdc; text-align:center"| Defenders

|-
! colspan="12" style="background:#dcdcdc; text-align:center"| Midfielders

|-
! colspan="12" style="background:#dcdcdc; text-align:center"| Forwards

|-
! colspan="12" style="background:#dcdcdc; text-align:center"| Players transferred out during the season

|-

Goalscorers

Notes

References

OGC Nice seasons
Nice